The Finnish sauna is a substantial part of Finnish and Estonian culture.

It was inscribed on the UNESCO Intangible Cultural Heritage Lists at the December 17, 2020 meeting of the UNESCO Intergovernmental Committee for the Safeguarding of the Intangible Cultural Heritage. As authorized by the state, the Finnish Heritage Agency commits, together with Finnish sauna communities and promoters of the sauna culture, to safeguard the vitality of the sauna tradition and to highlight its importance as part of customs and wellbeing. In the case of Estonia UNESCO Intangible Cultural Heritage Lists smoke sauna tradition since 2014.

The word sauna itself is of Finnish origin. In Estonian language it is saun.

History

Origins of the sauna 
The sauna in Finland is an old phenomenon and its roots are difficult to trace, but its earliest versions are believed to be from 7000 BC. Bath houses were recorded in Europe during the same time period, but Finnish bathing habits were poorly documented for most of history. One of the first written mentions of what is believed to be the sauna customs of the forefathers of the Finns was written by Nestor the Chronicler in 1112. He told of "hot wooden saunas in which naked bathers beat themselves with branches and finally pour cold water over themselves".

During the Reformation in Scandinavia the popularity of saunas expanded to other countries because the European bath houses were being destroyed.

One reason the sauna culture has always flourished in Finland has been because of the versatility of the sauna. When people were moving, the first thing they did was to build a sauna. Finns have used the sauna to live in, eat, address matters of hygiene, and, most importantly, give birth in an almost sterile environment. Unlike many other, more densely populated places in Europe, the availability of wood needed to build and warm the sauna has never been an issue. Another reason for its popularity is that in such a cold climate, the sauna allows people warmth for at least a short period of time. However, it is just as popular in the summer as in the winter.

Finnish sauna customs 

[[File:In de sauna. Slaan met berkentakken, Bestanddeelnr 920-4683.jpg|thumb|Women using Vihtas]]
Saunas are an integral part of the way of life in Finland. The sauna is an important part of the national identity and those who have the opportunity usually take a sauna at least once a week. The traditional sauna day is Saturday.

The sauna tradition is so strong that whenever Finns go abroad, they relish the chance to have a good sauna: even the Finnish Church in Rotherhithe, London, has its own sauna. Finnish soldiers on peacekeeping missions are famous for their saunas; even on the UNMEE mission in Eritrea, a sauna was one of the first buildings to be erected. A Second World War-era Finnish military field manual states that a break of eight hours is all that is required for a battalion to build saunas, warm them and bathe in them. Saunas, even in the military, are strictly egalitarian places: no titles or hierarchies are used in the sauna.

Water is thrown on the hot stones topping the kiuas, a special stove used to warm up the sauna. This produces great amounts of wet steam, known as löyly, increasing the moisture and the apparent temperature within the sauna. Only the word löyly is used for this particular type of steam; the Finnish word höyry ('steam, vapour') is never used for it except in a scientific sense. Equivalents for löyly can be found in the Finnic languages such as the Karelian löyly, the Estonian leil, the Votic leülü, the Veps l'öl' and the Livonian löul. Its original sense signified 'spirit, breath, soul' and this is still seen in the Uralic languages--for example, the Udmurt lul, the Komi lol, the Mansi läl ('life'), the Khanty lil and the Hungarian lélek.

Occasionally one uses a bunch of leafy, fragrant silver birch called a vihta (vasta in Eastern Finland) to gently beat oneself. This supposedly has a relaxing effect on the muscles and also helps to soothe the irritation from mosquito bites. When the heat begins to feel uncomfortable it is customary to jump into a lake, sea, or a swimming pool, or to have a shower. In the winter, rolling in the snow or even swimming in a hole cut in lake ice, an avanto, is sometimes used as a substitute. Often after the sauna it is a custom to sit down in the dressing room or on the porch of the sauna to enjoy a sausage, along with beer or soft drinks.

After cooling down from the first bath, one goes back into the hot room and begins the cycle again. The number and duration of hot room-cooling down cycles varies from person to person based on personal preference. Usually one takes at least two or three cycles, lasting between 30 minutes to two hours. In Finland's numerous summer cottages bathing might go on well into the night. This is especially true in the summer when there's virtually no darkness at night. The sauna session itself is finished off with a thorough wash.

For someone brought up in Finland, the rules are instinctive but they are difficult to put into words. Depending on the size, composition, relationships, and the age structure of the group three basic patterns can emerge: Everyone can go to the sauna at the same time, men and women may take a sauna separately, or each family can go to sauna separately. Mixed saunas with non-family members are most common with younger adults, and are quite rare for older people or on more formal occasions. It is common for teenagers to stop going to sauna with their parents at some point. 

In the sauna it is a faux pas to wear clothing in the hot room, although it is acceptable to sit on a small towel or pefletti, a disposable tissue designed to endure heat and humidity (it can be mandatory in a public sauna, such as at a public swimming pool). While cooling off it is common to wrap a towel around the body. For a typical Finn the sauna is, with few exceptions, a strictly non-sexual place; nudity in the sauna is a very normal state of affairs among Finns without any connection with sexual intercourse. In Finland a "sauna" means only a sauna, not a brothel, sex club, or such. In public saunas, swimsuits are banned from the hot room for health reasons: in many indoor swimming pools, chlorine is added to the water for hygiene reasons; if swimwear used in such water is brought to the hot room, the chlorine will vaporize and cause breathing problems for people with asthma or allergies.

In private homes or summer residences, the sauna is usually warmed to honor the guest and refusal may be more difficult. However, Finns will not typically be very offended if their guest declines. This is particularly common if going to sauna would require a lot of effort from the guest (such as re-applying complex make-up afterwards), socially inconvenient (feeling uncomfortable about nudity and/or a mixed-sex sauna), or otherwise inconvenient (should the guest not have a change of clothes or if the sauna would take place late at night, et cetera).

 Types of sauna 

Many different types of sauna can be found in Finland and Estonia. They can be classified either by the sauna building itself or by what kind of stove it uses.

The main division of saunas is between once warmed and continuously warmed stoves. All smoke saunas are once warmed, but there are also other type of ovens that are once warmed.

Once warmed stoves have larger amount of stones that are warmed up before the bathing. This can be done by burning wood, with or without a chimney, oil, wood pellets, or natural gas. Continuously warmed stoves have lower amount of stones that are heated during the bathing. The warming can be done burning wood, oil or natural gas, or electrically.

 Smoke sauna 

The savusauna (smoke sauna) does not have a chimney and thus as wood is burned smoke fills the room. After the sauna reaches the appropriate temperature, the fire is extinguished and the room is ventilated. Given the construction of the room, the sauna retains sufficient heat for the duration of use. Although smoke saunas are considered a more traditional type, there has been a significant increase in construction in recent years. However, due to the amount of effort and time required to operate them -- heating can take most of a day -- they are not likely to replace most regular saunas.

Smoke saunas are still extant not only in Finland but also in Estonia, Latvia, and Lithuania. They are considered to be cheap, simple to build, and durable (if measures of fire prevention are taken while building the sauna). The longevity is warranted by disinfectant features of smoke.

One specific and rarely seen curiosity is use of a wood pellet burner to heat a smoke sauna stove, typically the actual burner installed into a room adjacent to the actual sauna room and the kiuas. A wood pellet burner, quite similar to an oil burner, is then used to heat a smoke sauna stove - practically a big pile of rocks. As the burning process is much cleaner than with a conventional smoke stove the smoke aroma is much less pungent and soothy, while the moisture produced by the burning the pellets makes the air more pleasant than with continuously warmed stoves.

 Wood stove sauna 
The wood stove sauna is more common in rural areas, whereas the electric sauna is more common in urban areas. The metal stove with stones on top (kiuas) is heated with birch wood fire, and this heats the sauna room to the required temperature. If birch wood is not available any other wood will do, but well dried birch wood is preferred because of its good quality and smell, and long lasting burn. The important thing is to have a good löyly, that is when the stones are hot enough to evaporate the water thrown on them into steam that rises to the bathers. The bather in every type of sauna sits on a high bench near the ceiling where the hot steam reaches them quickly.

 Electric sauna 
In city apartments, and in most public saunas, an electric sauna stove (kiuas'') is used, as it does not require open fire and offers additional features like time delay settings, thermostat and temperature limiter. Also electric saunas usually do have kiuas stones piled over or around the heating element to allow löyly thrown onto them; either as an open, air circulating set-up or as a closed and insulated heat-storing one. Electric sauna offers a possibility for the property manager to control the sauna independently from occupants and limit sauna's electricity use. The control can be remote and wireless and can offer additional settings for sauna lighting, ventilation and steam generating devices. Apartment buildings' sauna is typically offered a few times in a week to occupants with dedicated hours for communal men's and women's sauna, and special hours for those who have requested apartment specific hours. People might prefer the more atmospheric wood stove sauna over an electric sauna, but for those living in urban apartment blocks that is rarely an option, and electric stoves are easier to use, more fire-safe, and don't produce wood litter.

Mobile saunas 

Scouts and various other youth organizations often have portable tent saunas. Saunas have been built into cars, buses, car trailers, tractor trailers or even bicycles and boats. In Finland, there are companies that rent mobile saunas, and an annual mobile sauna event in Teuva.

References

External links

 The Finnish Sauna - facts by Finland Travel Club
 The Finnish Sauna
 FAQ: The Finnish Sauna
 The Finnish Sauna society
 Finnish Sauna information
 How to Build A Sauna Room And How Much the Cost

Sauna
Sauna
Bathing
Nude recreation